Maria Gruber, Irene Leidolf, Stephanija Meyer, and Waltraud Wagner were four Austrian women who worked as nurse's aides at the Geriatriezentrum am Wienerwald in Lainz, Vienna, and who murdered scores of patients between 1983 and 1989.  The group killed their victims with overdoses of morphine or by forcing water into the lungs. By 2008, all four of the women had been released from prison.

Background
Wagner, 23, was the first to kill a patient with an overdose of morphine in 1983. She discovered in the process that she enjoyed playing God and holding the power of life and death in her hands.  She recruited Gruber, 19, and Leidolf, 21, and eventually the "house mother" of the group, 43-year-old Stephanija Meyer. Soon they had invented their own murder method: while one held the victim's head and pinched their nose, another would pour water into the victim's mouth until they drowned in their bed.  Since elderly patients frequently had fluid in their lungs, it was an unprovable crime. The group killed patients who were feeble, but many were not terminally ill.

Investigators criticized the hospital for meeting them with "a wall of silence" as they attempted to look into a suspicious 1988 death.  The aides were caught after a doctor overheard them bragging about their latest murder at a local tavern. In total, they confessed to 49 murders over six years, but may have been responsible for as many as 200. In 1991, Wagner was convicted of 15 murders, 17 attempts, and two counts of assault.  She was sentenced to life in prison.  Leidolf received a life sentence as well, on conviction of five murders, while Meyer and Gruber received 20 years and 15 years respectively for manslaughter and attempted murder charges.

In 2008, the Justice Ministry in Austria announced that it would release Wagner and Leidolf from prison due to good behavior. Mayer and Gruber had been released several years earlier and had assumed new identities.

References

External links

Crime Library, Angels of Death -- The Female Nurses by Katherine Ramsland

Austrian female serial killers
Austrian people convicted of murder
Health care professionals convicted of murdering patients
Hospital scandals
Living people
Medical controversies in Austria
Medical serial killers
People convicted of murder by Austria
Poisoners
Quartets
Year of birth missing (living people)